Tafsir Novin is an exegesis on the Quran written by  (b.1907 - d.1987), father of Ali Shariati.

The author is believed to be one of the pioneers of age-dependent commentation in Iran. Inspired by religious reformist ideas, in his book he targets common people. He avoids philosophical terms and tries to use as little lexicographical discussions as possible. From older commentations, he cites Majma' al-Bayan, Al-Tibbyan Fi Tafsir al-Quran, and Tafsir al-Kabir (al-Razi) which he both uses as reference and at times criticises.

References (Persian)
 Roshd Encyclopedia
 Tebyan: Introducing Tafsir Novin

Shia tafsir